Hazim Al-Zahrani (born 23 April 1999) is a Saudi Arabian professional footballer who plays as a left-back for Ohod on loan from Al-Ittihad.

Career 
Al-Zahrani started his career at Al-Ittihad's youth team. On 30 June 2019, Al-Zahrani was chosen in the Saudi program to develop football talents established by General Sports Authority in Saudi Arabia. He was sent on a one-year scholarship program in Spain. On 23 July 2019, Al-Zahrani signed his first professional contract with the Al-Ittihad. He was promoted to the first team after he returned from the scholarship program during the 2020–21 season. On 27 August 2021, Al-Zahrani made his professional debut for Al-Ittihad against Al-Faisaly in the Pro League, replacing Karim El Ahmadi. On 2 August 2022, Al-Zahrani joined Al-Khaleej on a season-long loan. On 28 January 2023, Al-Khaleej announced that they had ended Al-Zahrani's loan early. On 28 January 2023, Al-Zahrani joined First Division side Ohod on a six-month loan.

Honours

International 
Saudi Arabia U20
 AFC U-19 Championship: 2018

References

External links 
 

1999 births
Living people
Association football fullbacks
Saudi Arabian footballers
Saudi Arabia youth international footballers
Saudi Professional League players
Saudi First Division League players
Ittihad FC players
Khaleej FC players
Ohod Club players